Bijargah-e Sofla (also Romanized as Bījārgāh-e Soflá; also known as Bījārgāh-e Pā’īn) is a village in Machian Rural District, Kelachay District, Rudsar County, Gilan Province, Iran. At the 2006 census, its population was 340, in 87 families.

References 

Populated places in Rudsar County